Force of Darkness is a horror film about demonic possession. A woman witnesses a murder and a detective investigating the case believes the killer was possessed by the devil. It starred Mel Novak, Doug Shanklin, Loren Cedar, Mark Milan, Marlin Fischer,  Gordon Rigsby and Eddie Hailey.

Story
This is a film about a man who is under demonic possession.
Gloria Ramsey  witnesses the murder of her man who is a doctor. Detective Ben Johnson believes that Gloria is innocent of the crime and he goes after the killer who was the doctor's last patient, who has multiple personality disorder. Detective Johnson believes it's demonic possession that is involved. Conrad who is the killer roams the streets looking for victims. Detective Johnson has a job to stop him. The quest takes him to Alcatraz prison. Alcatraz prison is not empty. There are people who are staying there. The killer's possession may be related to demons that reside in Alcatraz. The demons that possess Conrad have an interest in Gloria and they beckon her to come to Alcatraz. A final confrontation is due in the prison that has been closed for 22 years.

Background
The film story was by Jack Baylam.

The video release slick says, The EXORSIST opened the door and now someone has made contact.

Possible Christian connection
There's a possible Christian connection to the film. Eddie Hailey who played Murry in the film, and Gene Redlon in Another Life had been a born again Christian for some years prior to this film. While on the set of Another Life, he would lead the cast in prayer each morning. Mel Novak who played Conrad in the film has been an ordained Christian pastor for decades.
James Gabriel Stipech who composed the music for the film also worked on a pro-life film called The Silent Scream which was released the previous year in 1984. He had been a member of Christian rock band The Way in 1976.

Cast

References

External links
 Imdb: Force of Darkness
 Videospace: Force of Darkness (1985)
 Video Collector: Force of Darkness (1985)

American supernatural horror films
American horror drama films
American psychological thriller films
Demons in film
American psychological horror films
American police detective films
American serial killer films
Religious horror films
Films about spirit possession
Films shot in California
Films set in San Francisco
Films set in the San Francisco Bay Area
Films shot in San Francisco
1985 horror films
1985 films
Alcatraz Island in fiction
1980s English-language films
1980s American films